Remodelled Beauty is a 1975 South Korean horror film.

Cast
Lee Nak-hoon
Yu Ji-in
Kim Ok-jin
Kim Jin-su
Park Am
Jeong Jin-a
Choe Sung-kwan
Kim Yun-suk
Maeng Hyeon-hui
Lee Jeong-hwa

South Korean horror films
1975 horror films
1975 films
1970s Korean-language films